Vengad is a gram panchayat situated  in Thalassery taluk, Kannur district, Kerala, India, on the banks of the Anjarakandi River. Vengad is famous for its black pepper and handloom. One state seed farm is located in Vengad. 
Vengad gram panchayat consists of 21 wards; viz Pattathari (1), Kallayi (2), Vengad Angadi (3), Vengad Metta (4), Vengad Theru (5), Oorppalli (6), Kaitheripoyil (7), Valankichal (8), Pathiriyad (9), Pachapoika (10), Parambayi (11), Kelalur (12), Mambaram (13), Poyanad (14), Keezhathur Balavadi (15), Keezhathur Vayanasala (16), Kuzhiyil Peedika (17), Mailulli (18), Kunnirikka (19), Paduvilayi (20)  and Thattari (21).

Vengad Panchayat has administration over Pathiriyad and Paduvilayi census towns. Vengad Gramapanchayat office is situated in Paduvilayi.
The Kannur International Airport is 6 km away from Vengad.

Places of worship
Vengad Sree Mahavishnu temple
Paduvilakkavu
Peringali Aredath, Puthiyaveedu Kottam Devasthanam
Vengad Mahaganapathy Temple (East Theru & West Theru)
Vengad Sree kurumba kavu
Vengad muthappan madapura
Vengad juma masjid (Vengad angadi)
Chambad Sri Kurumba Kavu
Valanki Koodan Gurukkanmar Kaavu
Koodan Gurukkanmar Kaavu Vengad
Paduvilayi Sree Deyivathar Temple

Schools
 EKNS Govt Higher Secondary School
 Vengad South UP School
 Vengad LP School
 Vengad Mappila UP School
 Vani Vidyalayam
 Indira Gandhi Public School
 Kottayam Rajas High School Pathiriyad
 Mambaram HSS Mambaram 
 Mambaram English Medium School Mambaram
 Keezhathur U P School Keezhathur 
 Kunnirikka U P School Kunnirikka

Transportation
The national highway passes through the town of Kannur.  Goa and Mumbai can be accessed on the northern side and Cochin and Thiruvananthapuram can be accessed on the southern side.  The road to the east of Iritty connects to Mysore and Bangalore. The nearest railway station is Kannur on Mangalore-Palakkad line.
Trains are available to almost all parts of India subject to advance booking over the internet. There are airports at Mattanur, Mangalore and Calicut. All of them are international airports but direct flights are available only to Middle Eastern countries.

See also
Pachapoika

References

Villages near Kannur airport